Vellakovil is a municipal town in Kangeyam taluk of Tirupur District, in the Indian state of Tamil Nadu. It is located on National Highway 81 between Trichy and Coimbatore. The town is spread in an area of 64.75 km2. As of 2011, the town had a population of 40,359. Kannapuram village located near to this town is famous for Kangeyam breed cattle market that happens on every year during Mariyamman temple festival in the month of April. It is an industrialized town with traditional agriculture being the occupation for most of the people. It holds lot of Power looms weaving bedsheets, floor mats and cotton materials being exported to foreign countries via exporters present in Karur.

Until 22 February 2009, this township was under district administration of Erode. Later it came under Tiruppur due to reorganizing of Coimbatore and Erode Districts into Coimbatore, Erode and Tiruppur Districts.

This municipal town has a population of 58,142 with 15,120 households according to 2022 estimation.

History

Vellakovil Village Panchyat was established in 1938.

The panchayat town was established in 1954 and upgraded to first grade panchayat town in 1963 further upgrades to selection grade panchayat town in 1982. The municipality was established in 2004 and upgraded to second grade municipality in 2010.

Geography

Demographics

According to 2011 census, Vellakovil had a population of 40,359 with a sex-ratio of 1,002 females for every 1,000 males, much above the national average of 929. A total of 3,438 were under the age of six, constituting 1,787 males and 1,651 females. Scheduled Castes and Scheduled Tribes accounted for 16.28% and 0.05% of the population respectively. The average literacy of the town was 74.37%, compared to the national average of 72.99%. The town had a total of 12,157 households. There were a total of 22,053 workers, comprising 577 cultivators, 1,776 main agricultural labourers, 1,077 in house hold industries, 17,098 other workers, 1,525 marginal workers, 30 marginal cultivators, 164 marginal agricultural labourers, 83 marginal workers in household industries and 1,248 other marginal workers.
As per the religious census of 2011, Vellakovil had 96.64% Hindus, 0.92% Muslims, 2.02% Christians, 0.03% Sikhs, 0.01% Buddhists and 0.38% following other religions.

Transport

Vellakovil is connected by roads to many major towns in the district.
Vellakovil is located on National Highway 81. Another National Highway NH 381A connects Vellakovil with Erode. State Highway running through Vellakovil connects Mulanur. 
Vellakovil is about 46 km South-East of Tirupur, 48 km South of Erode, 86 km East of Coimbatore, 18 km east of Kangeyam, 42 km West of Karur, 35 km north of Dharapuram.

Vellakovil Municipal town has 2 bus stands. 

New bus stand was constructed in 2002 when period of AIADMK, Chief Minister Selvi J Jayalalithaa opened the bus stand.

New bus stand is situated in erode road in which all far away buses come regularly for Coimbatore, Trichy, Tiruppur, Karur, Erode, and Dharapuram. There are frequently buses available for long distance cities like Madurai, Dindugal, Ooty, Oddanchatram, Tanjavore, Nagapattinam, Mayiladuthurai, Jayamkondam, Namakkal, Pudukkottai, Aranthangi, Thondi, Rameshwaram, Ariyalur, Avudayarkovil, Meemisal, Karaikudi, Palani, Mettupalayam, and Avinashi.

One old bus stand (100 years old) was established by Collector of Coimbatore region during the British Empire.

The old bus stand is situated in NH 81 which is in between Coimbatore and Trichy Megacities. So, all buses stop here without any hesitation and it's one of the major stops in NH81.

River & irrigation
The Amaravathi tributary of Kaveri River from western ghats pass through the village Lakkumanayakan patti which is located 11 km north of Vellakoil.

PAP (Parambikulam Aliyar Project) and LBP (Lower Bhavani Project) channels pass through nearest village of this town and serve as main source for agriculture.

Constituency
Till the year 2010, this town was under Vellakoil state assembly constituency of Tamilnadu State and Palani parliamentary constituency of Indian Lok sabha.

The member elected from this state constituency serves as Head of Portfolio for Rural Industries in the tenure of 1991-1996. Again, the member elected from this state constituency serves as Head of Portfolio for Highway & Minor port in the tenure of 2006-2011.

After restructure of constituency by Election Commission of India, since 2011 this town comes under 102.kangayam state assembly constituency of Tamilnadu State and Erode parliamentary constituency of Indian Lok sabha.

The member elected from this state constituency serves as Head of Portfolio for Minister of Information and Publicity since 2021.

Schools

Higher Secondary Schools
Arignar Anna Government 
Punitha Amala Annai Matric
Kongu Vellalar Matriculation 
Jayam Vidhya Bhavan Matric 
ANV Vidhyalaya Matric 
Punitha Amala annai girls (convent)
Bala Matric 
Kurinji Matric

Colleges 
Vellakovil Arts & Science College (affiliated with Bharathiar University Coimbatore) 
Senathipathy Nallammai IT College

Adjacent communities

References

External links
Official website

Cities and towns in Erode district